Northwest Missouri State University (NW Missouri) is a public university in Maryville, Missouri. It has an enrollment of about 8,505 students. Founded in 1905 as a teachers college, its campus is based on the design for Forest Park at the 1904 St. Louis World's Fair and is the official Missouri State Arboretum. The school is governed by a state-appointed Board of Regents and headed by Interim President Clarence Green.

The Northwest Bearcats compete in the National Collegiate Athletic Association (Division II) and Mid-America Intercollegiate Athletics Association for men's and women's sports.

History

Founding

In 1905, the Missouri Legislature created five districts in the state to establish normal schools, comprising a state teacher college network.

Maryville won the competition for the Northwest district with an offer to donate  (on coincidentally the northwest corner of town) and $58,000 on the site of a Methodist Seminary. The other districts in the network were to be at Kirksville (Northeast – now Truman State), Cape Girardeau (Southeast), Springfield (Southwest – now Missouri State), and Warrensburg (Central – now Central Missouri).

The original mission of the school, initially known as the Fifth District Normal School, was to teach elementary school teachers. Classes began on June 13, 1906, with a lab school teaching Maryville's children (that was eventually named the Horace Mann school) in kindergarten through third grade. The school was later expanded to a full-fledged high school before dropping back to its current configuration of kindergarten through sixth grade.

In 1919 the school was renamed Northwest Missouri State Teacher's College, and with that came the ability to grant baccalaureate degrees. In 1949 the name was shrunk to Northwest Missouri State College by the Board of Regents.

World War II
During World War II, Northwest Missouri State University was one of 131 colleges and universities nationally that took part in the V-12 Navy College Training Program, which offered students a path to a Navy commission.

Rivalry with Missouri Western
In 1969, Missouri Governor Warren Hearnes pushed for switching St. Joseph Junior College from a two-year school into a four-year state college. At approximately the same time, authorities decided against a plan to continue routing Interstate 29 north of St. Joseph along U.S. Route 71 through Maryville and Clarinda, Iowa, instead picking a route to Council Bluffs, Iowa/Omaha, Nebraska along the sparsely populated Missouri River bottoms.

Opening a new four-year state school within  of Maryville (along with a delay in widening U.S. Route 71 to Maryville) was perceived in Maryville as an attempt to kill the school and the town with which it is intertwined. Those fears came to the forefront in 1988 when Shalia Aery, commissioner of higher education under Governor John Ashcroft, announced a plan to close the school. The plan was ultimately withdrawn.

Northwest Missouri State University
On August 14, 1972, Northwest was elevated to university status so that it could offer master's degrees. Its name changed to Northwest Missouri State University.

The university currently holds four Missouri Quality Awards, granted in 1997, 2001, 2005, and 2008. Northwest is the only educational institution to receive multiple Missouri Quality Awards.

In 1987, Northwest unveiled its Electronic Campus Program, the first such program among public U.S. colleges.

Missouri State Arboretum

The campus design was inspired by the Forest Park design for the 1904 St. Louis World's Fair, which evolved into the campus for Washington University in St. Louis. In 1993 the state legislature designated Northwest the official Missouri State Arboretum.

Presidents
 Frank Deerwester (1906–1907)
 Homer Martien Cook (1907–1909)
 Henry Kirby Taylor (1909–1913)
 Ira Richardson (1913–1921)
 Uel W. Lamkin (1921–1945)
 J.W. Jones (1945–1964)
 Robert P. Foster (1964–1977)
 B.D. Owens (1977–1984)
 Dean L. Hubbard (1984–2009)
 John Jasinski (2009–Present)

Administration building

Design
The defining landmark of the campus is the Administration Building, very similar to Brookings Hall at Washington University in St. Louis. Brookings Hall served as the Administration Building of the 1904 St. Louis World's Fair. The master St. Louis design was created by Cope & Stewardson, famed for designing schools throughout the country based on the Oxford University style. It was listed on the National Register of Historic Places in 2010.

The Collegiate Gothic structure with its central tower keep design evokes Tattershall Castle and lords over the campus with the motto, "And the truth shall make you free," engraved in stone. Because of this design, the term "Tower" is used frequently throughout campus and is the name of the school yearbook. Work on the building began in 1906 and continued on and off until classes began in it on October 3, 1910. The architect of record for the Maryville building is John H. Felt. On March 15, 1919, a tornado ripped the roof off its auditorium and blew out most of its windows.

1979 fire
On July 24, 1979, a fire destroyed 60 percent of the building on the central and west wing as well as the north wing housing the auditorium and Little Theater. Many thought the building was going to be razed, However the east wing survived with relatively little damage.

A $13.8 million capital program repaired most of the building and made extensive changes to the campus layout. The building ceased to serve as classroom space, with the exception of 3rd floor, which houses the Family and Consumer Sciences Department. The theater and music departments moved out of the building to what is now the Ron Houston Center for the Performing Arts, located southeast of Bearcat Stadium. The north wing of the Administration Building was torn down and sealed, although the outline of the wing is still visible against the bricks on the north. The former Wells Library (now Wells Hall) was turned into a classroom area and home for the National Public Radio affiliate radio station KXCV-FM and the library was moved to its current location in the new B.D. Owens Library. All the academic files were burned and lost with no backups prior to the fire.

Athletics 

Northwest was a founding member of the Mid-America Intercollegiate Athletics Association in 1912 and has remained in the conference ever since.  From its founding until 1937 it competed in the Amateur Athletic Union. From 1937 to 1957 it competed in the National Association of Intercollegiate Athletics.  In 1957 it joined NCAA Division II. Northwest has appeared in ten Division II football title games (winning six) since 1998.  The men's basketball team appeared in an AAU title game in 1930. The men's basketball team won the Division II title for the 2016–17 season and 2018-19 season.

The Bearcats have won six NCAA Division II football national championships (1998, 1999, 2009, 2013, 2015, and 2016) and finished four times as runner-up (2005, 2006, 2007, and 2008). The Northwest Bearcats cheerleading squad have won three (2010, 2012, and 2013) Universal Cheerleaders Association Division II National Champions. The Northwest Bearcat Men's Basketball team has won four national championships (2017, 2019, 2021, 2022) in the span of five tournaments. With the 2016 football championship and the 2017 basketball championship, Northwest became the first Division II program to win titles football and men’s basketball in the same school year. The titles were the first by a Division I or II program since the Division I Florida Gators in 2006-07.

Student organizations
Student organizations encompass activities and interests that include
Academic (such as an Association for Computing Machinery chapter),
Greek fraternities and sororities,
Political (such as the College Republicans or the Young Democrats),
Honorary (such as the Blue Key Honor Society and Mortar Board),
Multicultural (with groups such as the Alliance of Black Collegians, the Asian Student Association, the Hispanic American Leadership Organization, and the Indian Student Association),
Performing (such as the American Choral Directors Association),
Religious (such as Campus Crusade for Christ),
Residential Life (with student governing bodies for the residential halls),
Sports (with clubs for cheerleading, fencing, rugby, soccer, wrestling and equestrian sports),
and dozens more.

Sororities at the university include
Alpha Delta Pi,
Alpha Sigma Alpha,
Delta Sigma Theta,
Phi Mu,
Sigma Alpha,
Sigma Kappa,
Sigma Sigma Sigma and
Zeta Phi Beta.
(Alpha Omicron Pi and Delta Zeta are no longer on the Northwest campus.)

There are 8 IFC fraternities.
Sigma Tau Gamma-1927
Phi Sigma Kappa-1938
Tau Kappa Epsilon-1954
Alpha Kappa Lambda-1963
Delta Sigma Phi-1968
Sigma Phi Epsilon-1980
Alpha Phi Alpha-1988
Alpha Gamma Rho-1990
(Phi Lambda Chi-late 1950s, Kappa Sigma-1996 and Phi Delta Theta-2003 Delta Chi-2015 are no longer on the Northwest campus.)

Notable alumni

Among Northwest's alumni are Jean Bartik, one of the original programmers for the ENIAC computer and a member of the Women in Technology International Hall of Fame.

Politicians
Jason R. Brown – Republican leader in the Missouri House of Representatives
Pat Danner – former U.S. representative from Missouri
Steve King – U.S. representative from Iowa's 4th congressional district.
Bill Siebert – former member of the Texas House of Representatives from San Antonio
Mike Thomson – Republican member of the Missouri House of Representatives
Kim Reynolds – Governor of Iowa
Allen Andrews - Republican member of the Missouri House of Representatives

Athletes
 Trevor Hudgins Point Guard for Houston Rockets
 Baron Corbin Former NFL offensive lineman, professional wrestler 
 Brandon Dixon – former NFL cornerback for the Tampa Bay Buccaneers, drafted in the 6th round of the 2014 Draft by the New York Jets.
 Brian Dixon – former NFL cornerback for the New Orleans Saints, signed as an undrafted free agent in 2014.
 Adam Dorrel – 3x National Champion winning coach, 4x MIAA champion coach, and 3x AFCA NCAA DII Coach of the Year
 Duck Dowell – former NBL player and coach. He was also a college football coach
 Charles Finley – former college basketball coach
 Tommy Frevert – former AFL placekicker
 Todd Frohwirth – former Major league baseball player
 Tom Funk – former Major league baseball player
 Gary Gaetti – former Major league baseball player
 Steve Gillispie – baseball college coach
 Chris Greisen – former NFL quarterback
 Harold Hull – former NBL player
 Joe Hurst – former NBL player
 Hal Hutcheson – former NBL player
 Ben McCollum – college basketball coach
 Jack McCracken – AAU basketball player from the 1930s and 1940s who in 1962 was enshrined into the Basketball Hall of Fame.
 Tony Miles – former Canadian Football League wide receiver; school's all-time leader in receptions, receiving yards and receiving touchdowns
 Ryland Milner – former college basketball and football coach
 Xavier Omon – former NFL running back and 2008 6th round draft pick of the Buffalo Bills
 Justin Pitts – professional basketball player
 Jamaica Rector – former NFL wide receiver
 Ivan Schottel – former NFL player and college football coach
 Mike Shane – professional wrestler
 Todd Shane – professional wrestler
 Wilbur Stalcup – former college basketball coach
 Mel Tjeerdsma – Northwest's 3x national champion winning coach, 12x MIAA champion coach, 4x AFCA NCAA DII Coach of the Year, Liberty Mutual DII Coach of the Year, most winning DII post-season coach with 22 victories, Athletic Director.
 Dave Tollefson – former NFL defensive end 
 Seth Wand – former NFL offensive lineman

See also 
Northwest Missourian – Student newspaper

References

External links

 
 Northwest Missouri State Athletics website
 

 
1905 establishments in Missouri
Buildings and structures in Nodaway County, Missouri
Education in Nodaway County, Missouri
Educational institutions established in 1905
National Register of Historic Places in Nodaway County, Missouri
Public universities and colleges in Missouri
University and college buildings on the National Register of Historic Places in Missouri